Donny van Iperen (born 29 March 1995) is a Dutch professional footballer who plays as a centre back for Moldovan Super Liga club Zimbru Chișinău.

Club career
He made his professional debut in the Eerste Divisie for SC Telstar on 8 August 2016 in a game against RKC Waalwijk.

On August 6, 2022, during a game against Dinamo-Auto Tiraspol, Van Iperen collided with the keeper. He fell into a coma and was transferred to the hospital in Chisinau. On August 13, Van Iperen was brought to the Netherlands for further treatment. This would be because healthcare in the Netherlands would be more optimal and better for Van Iperen.

References

External links
 
 

1995 births
People from Langedijk
Living people
Dutch footballers
SC Telstar players
Go Ahead Eagles players
Eerste Divisie players
Association football defenders
HVV Hollandia players
Footballers from North Holland